St Mellitus College is an English theological college established in 2007 by the Diocese of London and the Diocese of Chelmsford of the Church of England. It has campuses in Earl's Court, Chelmsford, Liverpool and Plymouth, with growing links with other churches, colleges and dioceses throughout the United Kingdom and beyond. The president is Graham Tomlin, Bishop of Kensington, and the dean is Russell Winfield. St Mellitus College is a wholly non-residential college and has pioneered context-based training within the Church of England, integrating academic theological study with ministry placements throughout the course of study.

History 
Named after the very first Bishop of London, whose territory covered London and Essex, the college was founded in 2007 by the bishops of London and Chelmsford to serve the church’s mission in those regions and beyond. The college was formed as a merger between North Thames Ministerial Training Course, which was based in the dioceses of London and Chelmsford, and St Paul’s Theological Centre (part of Holy Trinity, Brompton).

It has grown significantly since being founded and moved into its own premises at St Jude's Church, Kensington, in 2012, a building renovated specifically for this purpose. The centre houses a range of teaching space, rooms for pastoral care, academic and administrative offices, a growing academic library, space for hospitality and college worship.

In 2013, St Mellitus North West was established at Liverpool Cathedral, reestablishing full-time Anglican ordination training in that area for the first time in more than 40 years. This venture was directed by Jill Duff (now Bishop of Lancaster), in partnership with five dioceses in that area (Blackburn, Carlisle, Chester, Liverpool and Manchester). In September 2017, St Mellitus South West was launched, based in St Matthias Plymouth.

Organisation and purpose 
The college offers courses for many different kinds of students, including: 
 Anglican ordinands looking for full or part-time training, including for self-supporting and pioneer ministry 
 Lay workers and licensed lay ministers (LLMs, also known as readers)
 Undergraduate students on certificate, diploma and BA courses in theology, ministry and mission, or theology and youth ministry
 Postgraduate students on the MA in Christian Leadership, or MA in Theology, Ministry and Mission (specialising in systematic theology
 Church leaders from a range of denominations wanting to study theology and ministry more deeply 
 Those looking for an introduction to the study of theology, through the Beginning Theology programme, non-accredited study, or the School of Theology from SPTC
 Those wanting to learn more about church planting under the guidance of associate tutor Ric Thorpe (Bishop of Islington)
The college's programmes are validated by the universities of Durham or Middlesex, depending on the course.

Name and link to college mission 

The college is named after St Mellitus, one of the least known but most significant figures in the establishment of the church in London and Essex – a key moment in the conversion of the British Isles. Mellitus was sent to England by Pope Gregory the Great, following in the footsteps of St Augustine who had made the same journey a few years before.

Publications by college members 
 Why did Jesus have to die?, Jane Williams
 Kierkegaard: A Single Life, Stephen Backhouse
 The Widening Circle, Graham Tomlin
 Looking Through the Cross (the Archbishop of Canterbury's Lent Book 2014; Bloomsbury Continuum), Graham Tomlin
 Am I My Brother's Keeper?, Mark Scarlata
 A Brief Theology of Sport (SCM), Lincoln Harvey
 Beyond Old and New Perspectives on Paul: Reflections on the Work of Douglas Campbell, Chris Tilling (editor)
 How God Became Jesus, including contributions from Chris Tilling
 Theology and Economic Ethics: Martin Luther and Arthur Rich in dialogue (OUP), Sean Doherty
 The Only Way is Ethics, Sean Doherty
Faithful Living: Discipleship, Creed, and Ethics (SCM), Michael Leyden
 "God, Freedom and the Body of Christ" (Cascade), Alex Irving
 "We Believe: Exploring the Nicene Faith" (Apollos), Alex Irving
 "God's Church Community: The Ecclesiology of Dietrich Bonhoeffer" (T&T Clark), David Emerton
 "An Interweaving Ecclesiology: The Church, Mission, and Young People" (SCM), Mark Scanlan

Notable alumni

 Stephen Cottrell, Archbishop of York, Master of Arts degree
 Tim Hughes, worship leader, founder of Worship Central and vicar of St Luke's Gas Street
 Mike Pilavachi, founder of Soul Survivor and senior pastor of Soul Survivor Watford

References

External links 
 Official website

Buildings and structures of the Church of England
Educational institutions established in 2007
2007 in London
2007 establishments in England
Anglican buildings and structures in the United Kingdom
St Mellitus College